Stravithie railway station served the hamlet of Stravithie, Fife, Scotland from 1887 to 1930 on the Anstruther and St Andrews Railway.

History 
The station opened on 1 June 1887 by the Anstruther and St Andrews Railway. It originally had one platform but another was later added in 1898 and the original signal box was replaced with one to the east. The goods yard was to the south. The signal box closed in 1926 and the station closed on 22 September 1930.

References 

Disused railway stations in Fife
Railway stations in Great Britain opened in 1887
Railway stations in Great Britain closed in 1930
1897 establishments in Scotland
1930 disestablishments in Scotland
Former North British Railway stations